Unico Banking Group was a partnership of eight European co-operative banks founded in 1977 and effectively wound down in 2017.

The group's members were significant players in their respective markets covering a wide range of financial services from retail and corporate banking to investment and merchant banking. The link joining them is a shared co-operative background, however each individual organisation pursues its own strategy domestically and internationally.  The group members benefited by exchanging strategic views, offering each other business opportunities, sharing expertise and experience

In 2014, the Unico co-operation actively participated in the fields of climate bonds (in close co-operation with the European Investment Bank) and SME finance.

History 
Unico Banking Group was founded by six co-operative European banks in 1977. In 1997 the Group was formally registered as an EEIG (European Economic Interest Group) and today the group is composed of eight members.

In the late 1970s, internationalisation of the financial sector began gaining momentum, but Unico members did not at that time have strong networks of their own abroad. They therefore began working together in areas such as payments, the flow of documentation and capital market transaction/syndications. The banks involved also referred customers to one another on occasions when a customer could be better served by a partner bank abroad.

In the past, the idea of intensifying the co-operation within Unico in the form of a European Co-operative Bank was discussed, though this did not happen. An attempted merger between the German DG Bank (now DZ BANK), and Rabobank International in the late 1990s and early 2000 failed. This was largely because of the differences in structures and cultures between the banks.

Toward the end of the 1990s the Unico Banks developed UniCash and Unico Car Lease. The latter project ended in 2009 when results failed to meet expectations and competition between the members in the different countries increased.

In 2008, at the start of the financial crisis, the Unico banks were the first to resume unsecured lending of up to three months at the London interbank offered rate (Libor) in an effort to kick start interbank lending.

In 2017 the members concluded that their differences were too big to come to a beneficial cooperation and the governing bodies were unable to find points of common interest. It was decided to wind down the operations and cancel the general secretariat.

Members 
 Banco Cooperativo Espagnol (Spain)
 Crédit Agricole S.A. (France)
 DZ Bank (Germany)
 ICCREA Holding (Italy)
 OP Financial Group (Finland) 
 Rabobank (The Netherlands)
 Raiffeisen Bank International (Austria)
 Raiffeisen Bank Switzerland

Past leaders 
Chairmen of the Unico Banking Group:

Overview of the Secretary Generals of the Unico Banking Group:

Structure 
The Unico Banking Group consisted of a 12-member Board, an Executive Committee and a standing secretariat located in Brussels.

The standing secretariat coordinated on banking issues. A specific project structure is dedicated to UniCash, the International Cash Management Service, developed by Unico members in co-operation with external parties.

References

External links
 http://www.unicash-icm.com

Cooperative banking in Europe
Banking organizations